Mary Kitagawa (nee Murakami; born 1935)  is a Canadian educator. As a Japanese-Canadian growing up in British Columbia, her family was placed in various  Japanese Internment Camps during World War II. After the war, she accepted a position in Kitsilano Secondary School and was later awarded an honorary degree from the University of British Columbia.

Early life
Kitagawa was born and raised in  Salt Spring Island, British Columbia to a family of five. When she was seven years old, her father was arrested as part of the incarceration of Japanese Canadians across British Columbia's coastline during the Second World War. The rest of her family would eventually join her father in various Internment Camps and lose possession of their farm. After the war ended, she returned to Salt Spring Island in 1954.

Career
Kitagawa wished to begin her teaching career at home on Salt Spring Island but faced prejudices due to her race. As a result, she began her teaching career at Kitsilano Secondary School, where she would meet her future husband. After her children were born, she began work as a substitute teacher and eventually enrolled in the  University of British Columbia (UBC). In 2011, Kitagawa successfully advocated UBC to gift the 76 Japanese Canadian students who were forced out of UBC following the Attack on Pearl Harbor honorary degrees. She was later the recipient of the 2013 Queen Elizabeth II Diamond Jubilee Medal and National Association of Japanese Canadians Leadership Award. Kitagawa and her husband Tosh also sat on the Community Council for the Landscapes of Injustice project at the University of Victoria.

In 2018, Kitagawa received the Order of British Columbia for her activism efforts for Japanese Canadians.

References 

Living people
1935 births
Canadian educators
Japanese-Canadian internees
People from the Capital Regional District
Members of the Order of British Columbia